DynaLife is a Canadian private healthcare organization, headquartered in Edmonton, where it started as Dynacare Kasper Medical Laboratories (DKML) in the 1980s. It is partly owned by its American-based Laboratory Corporation of America (LabCorp), who acquired Dynacare in 2002. DynaLife has over a thousand employees working at its central laboratory in Edmonton, and in over 26 patient care centres in northern Alberta. DynaLife offers a number of diagnostic testing services.

Dynacare has its headquarters in Brampton, Ontario, and laboratories in Alberta, Ontario, Quebec, and Manitoba.  Dynacare also runs over 200 Laboratory and Health Services Centres in Alberta, and other provinces.

History
In 1987, Dynacare Health Group acquired its first diagnostic laboratory—Quality Medical Laboratories and established Dynacare Laboratories. By 2015, Dynacare was part of the Central Medical Laboratories (CML), established in 1959 in Winnipeg, Manitoba.

Dynacare was formed with the formation of an "operational partnership" in 1997 between Ontario's Bio-Science Laboratory and Gamma North Peel Partnership Inc. Gamma North Peel Partnership Inc, which had been established in 1968, was operating from a single medical building. Gamma Biopath Laboratory expanded to include "diagnostic imaging and computerized health assessment services" and opened "several patient services centres in the Greater Toronto, Hamilton and Stoney Creek areas of Ontario".

The 1994 Alberta Regional Health Authorities Act had created "new opportunities for contracting out both the management and delivery of public healthcare services to private business in lieu of public or non-profit agencies."  The Regional Health Authorities that were created through the 1994 Act, were given the authority to "create subsidiary corporations and delegate responsibilities, powers and duties to either public, private or hybrid agencies." In response to 1994 Act, Dynacare Kasper Medical Laboratories and MDS Kasper in southern Alberta, merged into "two large corporate entities or virtual private monopolies for contracting purposes." A 2009 Alberta Consumers Association report raised concerns that this merger had left "smaller companies out in the cold".

In 2002, Laboratory Corporation of America (LabCorp) acquired Dynacare Laboratories—one of the Dynacare partners—for US$480-million, while also assuming Dynacare debt worth $205-million.

By June 2020, Dynalife was operating 36 private laboratories in the Edmonton area and northern Alberta and had a contract with the Alberta government that is set to expire in 2022. In June 2020, Alberta Health Services, announced plans to outsource public community laboratory services to private companies.

When Gamma-Dynacare acquired LifeLabs Quebec, it became the leading provider of medical laboratory testing in Canada.

In 2013, DynaLife Medical Labs partnered with Dynacare, which operates laboratories in Alberta and across Canada.

In 2015, Gamma-Dynacare Medical Laboratories rebranded itself back to Dynacare.

In 2019, Dynacare was described as a LabCorp company, that is "continually developing new programs and services, including "home care services, and Dynacare Plus, an easy-to-use online portal where individuals can understand their lab test results and manage their health." Dynacare had "the largest and most advanced menu of diagnostic and screening tests in Canada." Dynacare Insurance Solutions "provide specialized testing and paramedical services for the insurance industry."

By 2020, Dynalife lab was conducting 70% of all tests in Edmonton and northern communities. In Calgary, Alberta Precision Laboratories, which is publicly owned and operated does most of the testing. Concerns were raised in the fall of 2020, when Alberta Premier "took the first big step toward privatization in health care" by outsourcing public health sector jobs. The next cuts will be in community lab testing, where "about 2,000 workers are expected to “transition” to the private provider." At the same time that Kenny was announcing privatization plans, Pincock came to Calgary to announce that Dynalife would be offering paid voluntary COVID-19 tests for  departing travellers at $150 per test. The Calgary Herald said that Dynalife is the preferred choice for Alberta's private lab services when the public health service is outsourced.

According to a January 27, 2022 Alberta Health Services news release, as of July 1, the private company, DynaLIFE Medical Labs, will expand their community laboratory services across the province. By June 29, 2020, when Alberta Health Services announced their intentions to privatize community lab services, many of these labs were run by a wholly owned AHS public subsidiary, Alberta Precision Laboratories (APL). The president of the Health Sciences Association of Alberta (HSAA)representing 6,000 laboratory technicians across Albertaraised concerns about job loss.  According to the December 31, 2019 Ernst & Young commissioned report"Alberta Health Services Performance Review", there were 210 sites across Alberta conducting 81 million tests, and employing 3,819 full-time workers with an annual operating budget of $800 million. Of these sites, 174 were run by the APL, and 36 were operated by the private provider, DynaLife. Friends of Medicare expressed concern about the AHS contract with the private, for-profit DynaLife, replacing the public community medical laboratory services. The organization is concerned about the UCP government's privatization of the public health care system; with this most recent change expanding on similar privatization in "laundry services, surgical services, our continuing care system, EMS services, and others". DynaLife's 5-year contract with AHS was to end in March 2022. It has been agreed to by a previous Progressive Conservative government after DynaLIFE appealed AHS's contractual arrangement for provision of lab services with Sonic Healthcare, an Australian company. Sonic would have provided these services in Edmonton and northern Alberta starting in October 2014, but the contract was cancelled through DynaLIFE's successful appeal.

By 2002, Dynacare, just before LabCorp's takeover, had become the largest central clinical laboratory in western Canada, with a revenue in 2001 of $402.4-million and a profit of $11.7-million.

Ownership

In 2002, Laboratory Corporation of America Holdings (LabCorp), a clinical lab provider based in the United States, acquired Dynacare Laboratories. LabCorp purchased all of Dynacare's outstanding shares for US$480 million and assumed Dynacare's debt of US$205 million. At the time of purchase, Dynacare medical laboratories provided services in Canada and in 21 American states. The Globe and Mail reported that the takeover would not have an effect on "Dynacare's operational partnerships with Gamma NorthPeel and Bio-Science Laboratory in Ontario and with Kasper Medical Laboratories and MDS Laboratories in Alberta".

References

Companies based in Edmonton